Kiara (  or  ) is a  given name with various origins.

It may be a variant of the Italian name Chiara, meaning bright, or the Irish name Ciara, meaning dark-haired. 

In Japan, Kiara is an uncommon name typically given to males; its meaning is dependent upon the characters used to spell the name. It has also been used for girls in Japan in recent years and classified as part of a trend for kira-kira or shiny names notable for using uncommon kanji characters to spell names that have novel meanings or pronunciations. For instance, the given name of Kiara Sato (Japanese: 佐藤 妃星), a member of the Japanese idol girl group AKB48 Team 4, uses kanji characters meaning princess and star.

Usage
The name has been in wide use worldwide. In the United States it has been among the top 1,000 names for newborn girls since 1988. It also has been rarely used for American boys.

People
Kiara (singer) (born 1963), Venezuelan singer-songwriter
Kiara Advani (born 1992), Indian actress
Kiara Bisaro (born 1975), Canadian mountain biker
Kiara Bowers (born 1991), Australian rules footballer
Kiara Brinkman (born 1979), American writer 
Kiara Fontanesi (born 1994), Italian professional motocross racer
Kiara Fontanilla (born 2000) American-born soccer player for the Philippines women's national football team
Kiara Kabukuru (born 1975), American fashion model
Kiara Laetitia (born 1979), Italian rock singer and entrepreneur
Kiara Leslie (born 1995), American professional basketball player
Kiara Muhammad (born 1998), American actress
Kiara Munteanu (born 1997), Australian gymnast
Kiara Nirghin (born 2000), South African inventor, scientist and speaker
Kiara Nowlin (born 1995), American gymnast
Kiara Ortega (born 1993), Puerto Rican dancer and beauty pageant title holder
Kiara “Kiki” Pickett (born 1999), American professional soccer player
Kiara Rodriguez (born 2002), Ecuadoran Paralympic athlete
Kiara Saitō (齋藤樹愛羅)(born 2004), Japanese idol
Kiara Sasso (born 1979), Brazilian actress
Kiara Sato (佐藤妃星) (born 2000), a member of AKB48 Team 4, Japanese idol

Fiction
Kiara, fictional character in the film The Lion King II: Simba's Pride
Kiara “Kie” Carrera, a character in the Netflix series Outer Banks
Sessyoin Kiara, fictional character in the PSP game Fate/Extra: CCC and mobile gacha game Fate/Grand Order

See also
Kiiara (Kiara Saulters, born 1995), American singer
Kiara (disambiguation)
Keira (disambiguation)

Notes

cs:Kiara
pt:Kiara